Ctenomeristis ebriola is a species of snout moth in the genus Ctenomeristis. It was described by Edward Meyrick in 1934 and is known from Sri Lanka.

References

Moths described in 1934
Phycitini